Daniel B. Dougherty (born November 11, 1883) was an American college football and basketball player and coach. He served as the head football coach at Grinnell College in 1909, compiling a record of 2–5–1.

References

1883 births
Year of death missing
American men's basketball players
Chicago Maroons football players
Duquesne Dukes men's basketball players
Grinnell Pioneers football coaches
Grinnell Pioneers men's basketball coaches
Washington & Jefferson Presidents football players
High school football coaches in Illinois
Sportspeople from Iowa City, Iowa